This is a list of contestants who have appeared on the American television show America's Next Top Model. Hosted by model Tyra Banks and her panel of judges, a number of aspiring models compete to win a modeling contract with a top modeling agency, a cover and/or spread in a fashion magazine, and a cosmetics campaign. The series first aired in 2003 and as of 2018, twenty-four cycles have aired A total of 311 different participants have been selected as finalists in the show in its fifteen years running, with twenty-four models (Adrianne Curry, Yoanna House, Eva Pigford, Naima Mora, Nicole Linkletter, Danielle Evans, CariDee English, Jaslene Gonzalez, Saleisha Stowers, Whitney Thompson, McKey Sullivan, Teyona Anderson, Nicole Fox, Krista White, Ann Ward, Brittani Kline, Lisa D'Amato, Sophie Sumner, Laura James, Jourdan Miller, Keith Carlos, Nyle DiMarco, India Gants, and Kyla Coleman) crowned "America's Next Top Model".

Contestants usually apply to be on the show through video-auditioning, or attend casting calls, but the series has been known to recruit contestants from a myriad of various methods. Cycle 9 winner Saleisha Stowers and cycle 11 second runner-up Analeigh Tipton were recruited via MySpace. Isis King from cycle 11 was recruited after appearing as an extra from cycle 10's homeless photo shoot, while cycle 6 contestant Sara Albert was scouted at a mall. Cycle 13's Ashley Howard was also scouted at The Tyra Banks Show, while cycle 15 contestants Jane Randall and Kendal Brown were scouted through a photo challenge on Tyra Banks' website. Cycle 20 contestant Mike Scocozza was scouted while working in an ice cream truck. In more recent years of the show, the production team has taken to scouting for contestants on various social media platforms, like Instagram.

Contestants

Notes

 Contestants' ages are at the time of their respective season's filming.
 Disqualified.

Statistics
 Quitters: 10 – Cassandra Whitehead (Cycle 5), Ebony Morgan (Cycle 9), Kim Rydzewski (Cycle 10), Amber DePace (Cycle 13), Ondrei Edwards (Cycle 16), Louise Watts (Cycle 18), Alisha White (Cycle 18), Maria Tucker (Cycle 19), Liz Woodbury (Cycle 24) and Brendi K Seiner (Cycle 24)
 Disqualifications: 2 – Angelea Preston (Cycle 17) and Romeo Tostado (Cycle 21)
 Models eliminated outside of judging panel: 6 – Magdalena Rivas (Cycle 3), Hannah White (Cycle 11), Rachel Echelberger (Cycle 13), Terra White (Cycle 15), Cory Hindorff (Cycle 20) and Shanice Carroll (Cycle 24)
 Most times in the bottom two: 5 times – Ann Markley (Cycle 3), Bre Scullark (Cycle 5) and Jade Cole (Cycle 6)
 Most times in the bottom two for a winner: 4 times – Whitney Thompson (Cycle 10)
 Most times in the bottom two for a runner-up: 4 times - CoryAnne Roberts (Cycle 23)
 Fewest times in the bottom two for a winner: 0 times – Jaslene Gonzalez (Cycle 8), McKey Sullivan (Cycle 11), Nicole Fox (Cycle 13), Krista White (Cycle 14), Sophie Sumner (Cycle 18), Jourdan Miller (Cycle 20) and India Gants (Cycle 23)
 Fewest times in the bottom two for a runner-up: 0 times – Joanie Dodds (Cycle 6), Anya Kop (Cycle 10) and Mamé Adjei (Cycle 22)
 Most first call-outs: 7 times - Ann Ward (Cycle 15) and Jourdan Miller (Cycle 20)
 Most first call-outs for a runner-up: 5 times - Joanie Dodds (Cycle 6) and Anya Kop (Cycle 10)
 Least first call-outs for a winner: 1 time - Adrianne Curry (Cycle 1), Yoanna House (Cycle 2), Nicole Linkletter (Cycle 5), Danielle Evans (Cycle 6), Whitney Thompson (Cycle 10) and Brittani Kline (Cycle 16)
 Least first call-outs for a runner-up: 0 times - Laura Kirkpatrick (Cycle 13) and Chelsey Hersley (Cycle 15)

Deaths
Mirjana Puhar (Cycle 21), aged 19, February 24, 2015
Kim Rydzewski (Cycle 10), aged 29, December 19, 2016
Jael Strauss (Cycle 8), aged 34, December 4, 2018

References

America's Next Top Model contestants